Graeme Brown (born 8 November 1980 in Johannesburg, South Africa) is a South African-born Scottish football striker . Brown began his career at Cowdenbeath as a 16-year-old in 1997. He scored 60 goals in six and a half years at Central Park, earning a move to Ayr United in January 2004. His appearances for the club were restricted by a broken foot and he moved to Alloa Athletic in March 2005.

He was released from Alloa to his former club Cowdenbeath in the January 2009 transfer window.

After struggling to find goals in Cowdenbeath's run in to the 2008/09 season, Brown was released by mutual consent. He has now retired from professional football and works as a solicitor in Glasgow.

References

External links

Living people
1980 births
Alloa Athletic F.C. players
Ayr United F.C. players
Cowdenbeath F.C. players
Association football forwards
Soccer players from Johannesburg
Scottish people of South African descent
British sportspeople of South African descent
Scottish footballers
South African soccer players
South African people of Scottish descent
Scottish Football League players
South African emigrants to the United Kingdom